Leopolis (from Greek roots meaning lion city) may refer to:

The Latin name for Lviv, Ukraine
Leopolis Jazz Fest, held in Lviv
Leopolis, Missouri, USA; a ghost town
Leopolis, Wisconsin, USA; an unincorporated community
Leópolis, Paraná, Brazil; a municipality
Leópolis, the Portuguese and Spanish name of Lviv

See also

 Siṃhapura, the Sanskrit origin of Singapore, also means lion city
 Shicheng, a Chinese underwater city. Its name means lion city